In music, Op. 48 stands for Opus number 48. Compositions that are assigned this number include:

 Beethoven – "Gellert Lieder", which includes "Die Himmel rühmen des Ewigen Ehre", a setting for voice and piano of Die Ehre Gottes aus der Natur
 Chopin – Nocturnes, Op. 48
 Draeseke – Quintet for Piano, Strings and Horn
 Dvořák – String Sextet
 Fauré – Requiem
 Glazunov – Symphony No. 4
 Hovhaness – Lousadzak
 MacDowell – Indian Suite
 Milhaud – L'Homme et son désir
 Schumann – Dichterliebe
 Sibelius – Vapautettu kuningatar
 Strauss – Freundliche Vision
 Tchaikovsky – Serenade for Strings
 Weber – Grand Duo Concertant